La Barre is a commune in the Jura department and Bourgogne-Franche-Comté region of eastern France.

Population

See also
Communes of the Jura department

In fiction
The fictional character Jean-Luc Picard – who features in the American TV series Star Trek: The Next Generation (and subsequent films based upon it) as captain of the 24th-century starships USS Enterprise-D and USS Enterprise-E – is described as having been born in "La Barre" on 13 July 2305. The location of Picard's family village was indicated as being in the Bourgogne-Franche-Comté region of France on wine bottle labels seen in the trailer for Star Trek: Picard, released on May 23, 2019.  However, as there are two La Barres in this region of France, it is not firmly established that this La Barre is Picard's home village  it could be La Barre, Haute-Saône.

In the tenth episode of the second season of Star Trek: Picard, Picard explains that his ancestors hid weapons in the tunnels of Château Picard during World War II. The La Barre in Jura was closer to the demarcation line between the zone libre of Vichy France and its occupied territory. La Barre, Haute-Saône is further south and well past the demarcation line.

References

Communes of Jura (department)